The Song Tells Its Story, sometimes The Tango Tells Its Story, is a 1976 Argentine musical film directed by Fernando Ayala and Héctor Olivera.  The film tells the history of song in Argentina, with a particular history of tango.

The film was made during the period of the Argentine military dictatorship.  The censorship of the regime forced Olivera and Ayala to cut scenes featuring the banned and exiled singer Mercedes Sosa.

The film should not be confused with The Tango Tells its Story, released in 1914, a documentary history of the tango.

Cast

Musical performers 
Musicians performing in the film are:
 Cayetano Daglio
 Ángel Villoldo
 Francisco Canaro
 Carlos Gardel
 Rosita Quiroga
 Ignacio Corsini
 Ada Falcón
 Agustín Magaldi and Pedro Noda
 Marta de los Ríos
 Margarita Palacios
 Eduardo Falú
 Los Cantores de Quilla Huasi
 Jorge Cafrune
 Amelita Baltar
 Los Hermanos Abalos

Some of these performances are archive footage from other films of notable singers.

References

External links
 

1976 films
Argentine musical films
1970s Spanish-language films
Films directed by Fernando Ayala
Films directed by Héctor Olivera
1970s Argentine films